HMAS Rushcutter (M 80) was one of two Bay class minehunters built for the Royal Australian Navy by Carrington Slipways at its Ramsay Fibreglass facility in Tomago, New South Wales. She was launched on 8 May 1986 and commissioned on 1 November 1986. She was decommissioned on 14 August 2001. She and sister ship  were sold in 2002 for service in the Persian Gulf. At some point before 2013, the vessel ended up in private hands in Rozelle Bay.

References

Bay-class minehunters
Ships built in New South Wales
1986 ships